Stijn is a Dutch short form of names ending in "stijn" such as Constantijn or Augustijn. It was the tenth most popular name for boys born in the Netherlands in 2007. People with this name include:

Stijn Celis (born 1964), Belgian choreographer and set designer
Stijn Claessens (born 1959), Dutch economist 
Stijn Coninx (born 1957), Belgian film director
Stijn D'Hulst (born 1991), Belgian volleyball player
Stijn De Smet (born 1985), Belgian football midfielder
Stijn Dejonckheere (born 1988), Belgian volleyball player
Stijn Derkx (born 1995), Dutch football striker
Stijn Devolder (born 1979), Belgian racing cyclist
Stijn Francis (born 1982), Belgian football midfielder
Stijn van Gassel (born 1996), Dutch football goalkeeper
Stijn Haeldermans (born 1975), Belgian football midfielder
Stijn Houben (born 1995), Dutch football defender
Stijn Huysegems (born 1982), Belgian football forward
Stijn Jaspers (1961–1984), Dutch middle- and long-distance runner
Stijn Koomen (born 1987), Dutch actor
Stijn de Looijer (born 1992), Dutch football midfielder
Stijn van der Meer (born 1993), Dutch baseball player
Stijn Meert (born 1978), Belgian football midfielder
Stijn Minne (born 1978), Belgian football defender
Stijn Neirynck (born 1985), Belgian racing cyclist
Stijn Schaars (born 1984), Dutch football midfielder
Stijn Spierings (born 1996), Dutch football midfielder
Stijn Steels (born 1989), Belgian racing cyclist
Stijn Streuvels (1871–1969), Belgian writer
Stijn Van Cauter (born 19??), Belgian electronic musician
Stijn Vandenbergh (born 1984), Belgian racing cyclist
Stijn Vreven (born 1973), Belgian football defender and manager
Stijn Wuytens (born 1989), Belgian football midfielder
Stijn Hendrikse (born 1971) Dutch entrepreneur, businessman

Notes

Dutch masculine given names